Gilles Chapadeau is a Canadian politician, who was a Parti Québécois member of the National Assembly of Quebec for Rouyn-Noranda–Témiscamingue from 2012 to 2014.

He was elected in the 2012 Quebec general election, but was defeated in 2014 and 2018.

References

External links

 Candidate page

Parti Québécois MNAs
Living people
People from Abitibi-Témiscamingue
21st-century Canadian politicians
Year of birth missing (living people)